The Oleta River State Park is a  state park on Biscayne Bay in the municipal suburb of North Miami in metropolitan Miami, Florida. Adjoining the Biscayne Bay Campus of Florida International University, the park contains one of the largest concentrations of Casuarina trees (Australian 'pine'), an invasive species in the state park system.

Facilities
The central feature of this park is the mouth of the Oleta River, for which it is named. The river has drawn human inhabitants to the area since about 500 B.C, when its shores served as a campground for Tequesta Indians. It was used by U.S. troops (who called it Big Snake Creek) in 1841 during the Second Seminole War, and further explored in 1881 by Naval Captain William Hawkins Fulford, whose ventured inland to what is now the city of North Miami Beach. The area became more heavily settled in the 1890s and in 1922, developers changed the name from Big Snake Creek to the Oleta River.

The river itself no longer flows to the Everglades, but remains a popular area for canoeing. The park also boasts some of the best wilderness bike trails in the country, and is a frequent host for triathlons and other extreme sports events. There is a beach on Biscayne Bay, kayak rentals, and primitive cabins. Oleta River State Park is also the headquarters to one of the state's five AmeriCorps Florida State Parks chapters.

Health concerns
Oleta River State Park is adjacent to Munisport landfill, a former superfund site. However, no health issues at Oleta River state park have been linked to the landfill.

Gallery

See also
Oleta River

External links
 Oleta River State Park at Florida State Parks
 Oleta River State Recreation Area at Absolutely Florida
 Oleta River State Recreation Area at Wildernet
Oleta River State Park Mountain Bike Trail at Dirtworld.com

References

Beaches of Miami-Dade County, Florida
Parks in Miami-Dade County, Florida
State parks of Florida
North Miami, Florida
Beaches of Florida
1986 establishments in Florida